Navaratna Srinivasa Rajaram (22 September 1943 – 11 December 2019) was an Indian academic and a Hindutva ideologue. He is notable for propounding the "Indigenous Aryans" hypothesis, asserting that the Vedic period was extremely advanced from a scientific view-point, and claiming of having deciphered the Indus script. Academics find his scholarship to be composed of dishonest polemics in service of a communal agenda.

Personal life 
Rajaram was born on 22 September 1943 into a Deshastha Madhva Brahmin family in Mysore. His grandfather Navaratna Rama Rao was a colonial scholar and vernacular author of regional fame. Rajaram held a Ph.D. degree in mathematics from Indiana University and taught in American universities for over 20 years, including stints at Kent State University and Lockheed Corporation. He died in Bengaluru on 11 December 2019 at the age of 76.

Indology
Rajaram extensively published on topics related to ancient Indian history and Indian archaeology, alleging a Eurocentric bias in Indology and Sanskrit scholarship. He advocated the Indigenous Aryans hypothesis and rejected Indo-Aryan migration theory as a fabricated version of history devised for missionary and colonial interests, and later propounded by left-liberals and Marxists. Dating the Vedas to circa 7000 BC, he also propounded that the Harappan civilization of the Indus Valley corresponds with the end phase of the Vedic Age and thus hypothesized it to be a part of Vedic era.

In Puratattva, the journal of the Indian Archaeological Society, Rajaram claimed that "Vedic Indians" had taught the Pharaohs of Egypt to build the Pyramids. He also asserted the concept of secularism to be irrelevant to a pluralistic state, which ancient Hindu India was. He also claimed to have deciphered the Indus script and equated it to late Vedic Sanskrit.

Criticism
In 2000, Rajaram flaunted a horse on an Indus seal as a path-breaking discovery that supposedly lend credence to the belief that Aryans were the actual inhabitants of the Indus Valley Civilization, until Michael Witzel and Steve Farmer exposed the fraud in the Frontline magazine later that year. Asko Parpola, professor of Indology at Helsinki University, commented:

His claims of having deciphered the Indus script were universally rejected. Noted epigraphist and an expert in Indus scripts-- Iravatham Mahadevan dismissed Jha-Rajaram work as a "non-starter" and "completely invalid", that even mis-analysed the direction of reading. Speaking from the chair of the President, on the occasion of the 2001 session of Indian History Congress, as to the recent advances in the deciphering of the Indus Script, Mahadevan noted:

Thapar noted Rajaram's writings to resemble nineteenth century tracts that were evidently unfamiliar with tools of historiography but were sprinkled with programming references; so as to suggest scientific objectivity. She also noted that anybody who disagreed with him was branded a Marxist. K. N. Panikkar criticized his works to be a communal intervention in historiography that was not an academic exercise in quest of truth but rather a political project knowingly undertaken with a cavalier attitude to the established norms of the discipline, so as to hamper the secular fabric of the society and lead to the establishment of a Hindu state. Endowed with the support of the ruling party, this succeeded in floating an alternative narrative of history and turning history into a contentious issue in popular discourse.

Sudeshna Guha notes him to be a sectarian non-scholar. Cynthia Ann Humes criticized Rajaram's Politics of History as a polemic work whilst Suraj Bhan noted it to be a demonstration of historical revisionism. Michael Witzel noted him to be an autochthonous writer, whose books were a mythological rewrite of history and were designed for the expatriate Indians of the 21st century, who sought a " largely imagined, glorious but lost distant past".

See also 
 Indigenous Aryans
 Indo-Aryan migration
 Nationalism and ancient history

References

Bibliography

External links 

Articles by Rajaram in India Facts

1943 births
2019 deaths
Indian social sciences writers
Writers from Mysore
Indigenous Aryanists
20th-century Indian mathematicians
Scientists from Karnataka
Pseudohistorians
Hindutva
Voice of India writers
Indian expatriates in the United States
Indiana University alumni